Jannatul Ferdous Peya, also known as Peya Jannatul, is a Bangladeshi model, actress and a lawyer. She is a beauty pageant titleholder who was crowned Miss Bangladesh 2007.

Career
Peya started her modeling career in 2008 after she had won the title of  Miss Bangladesh in 2007. In 2014–15, she worked with Mascot Model Management in New Delhi, which is an India-based modeling agency. She  also worked in a Hindi music video in 2014 
In 2013 she won the crown of Miss Indian Princess International  beating contestants from 19 countries.

She has so far acted in several dramas such as, To Be or Not to Be and Projapotir Shukh Dukkho.

Her first movie was Chorabali directed by Redwan Rony in 2012. Her next releases were Gangster Returns and Story of Samara.

She is a lawyer as well. As of August 15, 2022 she has become an Advocate at the Supreme Court of Bangladesh.

Recent works
Peya is the first cover girl of Vogue India from Bangladesh. While sharing her experiences  Peya stated that she finds her inspiration from Deepika Padukone and wants to expand her career internationally like Deepika.

In February 2017, Peya was named the brand ambassador of TRESemmé which is a famous brand for hair caring and styling associated with New York Fashion Week (NYFW). This glamorous diva attended NYFW this year. NYFW is one of the biggest fashion events of the whole world which brings brands, designers and models together. She said that it was a great honour to be there as a first Bangladeshi model and expressed her wish to work as a model influencer.

In September 2018, Peya became the brand ambassador of Yamaha Motorcycles Bangladesh.

Besides having a strong modeling career she also hosted cricket matches in BPL 2017. She made her second appearance  as host in BPL 2018 on GTV screen. From the enormous response of these two seasons of hosting BPL she was invited as a presenter to work in ICC 2019 Cricket World Cup. She is the first Bangladeshi to work as a presenter in ICC World Cup.

Host
BPL 2018
BPL 2019

Book
Koishor Theke Zouboner Golpo, 2023

Filmography

Awards

References

External links
 

Living people
People from Khulna
Bangladeshi female models
Bangladeshi film actresses
21st-century Bangladeshi actresses
Alumni of University of London Worldwide
Alumni of the University of London
Bangladeshi beauty pageant winners
Best Supporting Actress Bachsas Award winners
Date of birth missing (living people)
Year of birth missing (living people)